Cláudia Magno de Carvalho (February 10, 1958 – January 6, 1994) was a Brazilian actress and dancer.

The actress began her career in 1981, working on various plays. She participated in the blockbuster movie Menino do Rio in 1982, and was then called by Rede Globo to participate in the novel Final Feliz. She also appeared in the films Garota Dourada (1984) and Presença de Marisa (1988), for which she won the Candango for best actress at the Festival de Brasília in 1988.

Claudia died of acute respiratory failure due to AIDS at the São Vicente clinic in Gávea. When she died, she was working on the telenovela Sonho Meu, which housed nurse Josefina, as well as rehearsing a musical with actor Jonas Bloch.

Filmography

Television

Films

Notes
 Cláudia Magno was the girlfriend of actor Marcelo Ibrahim.

References

External links 

1958 births
1994 deaths
Actresses from Rio de Janeiro (city)
Brazilian television actresses
Brazilian telenovela actresses
Brazilian film actresses
Brazilian female dancers
20th-century Brazilian actresses
20th-century Brazilian dancers
AIDS-related deaths in Rio de Janeiro (state)
Respiratory disease deaths in Rio de Janeiro (state)
Deaths from respiratory failure